The St Helens Reporter is a weekly paid-for newspaper in St Helens, Merseyside, England. The Reporter is competing with the more traditional St Helens Star as the number one paper in the town.

External links 
 St Helens Reporter home page

Weekly newspapers published in the United Kingdom
Publications with year of establishment missing
Metropolitan Borough of St Helens